Keung To (born 30 April 1999) is a Hong Kong singer and actor, and a member of the Hong Kong boy band group Mirror. He rose to fame after winning ViuTV's reality talent competition Good Night Show - King Maker  in 2018. Keung made his solo debut in June 2019 with the single "No. 1 Seed".

Early life
Keung To was born at Queen Mary Hospital on 30 April 1999. He is an only child. He attended Oi Kwan Road Baptist Church Lui Kwok Pat Fong Kindergarten, Hennessy Road Government Primary School (Causeway Bay), Tang Shiu Kin Victoria Government Secondary School, and graduated with a diploma from Yeo Chei Man Senior Secondary School.

In 2017, Keung participated in the Mainland Chinese talent show Super Boy. He was victorious in the regional trials, becoming one of the four representatives of the region of Hong Kong, Macau and Taiwan. He finished in the top 30.

Music career

2018–present: Mirror 

In 2018, Keung participated in the television reality talent show, Good Night Show - King Maker created by ViuTV as contestant #99. On 14 October, he won the competition, finishing with a combined score of 21.4%, determined by a professional judging panel and public votes.

On 3 November 2018, Keung made his debut as a member of boy music group, Mirror, at a press conference with their debut single "In a Second" (一秒間).

2019–present: Solo activities 
In June 2019, Keung made his solo debut with the release of "Seed No.1", quickly climbing the mainstream pop music charts, topping at third place.

In July, he held a solo concert, for which tickets quickly sold out. His following two singles, "Atlantis", released in September, and "A Little More A Day", in December, both charted on Hong Kong pop music charts.

In 2020, the COVID-19 pandemic interrupted his plans to South Korea to film a music video for a new song that had already been produced. In response to the pandemic, Keung released the single "The Love Without Words" (also known as "Saying I Love You With My Mouth Covered"). The music video, directed by Fen Yuen, emphasised the pandemic's effects on the lifestyle of Hongkongers. "The Love Without Words" won Most Popular Song at the 2020 Ultimate Song Chart Awards Presentation. Keung also won Most Popular Male Singer at the same award show.

On 2 September 2020, Keung released his fifth single "Disease of Loneliness". In contrast with the styles of his previous songs, the lyrics for this single evokes a deep sadness, revolving around Keung's personal experiences with loneliness, and the melody is more delicate. Keung created and directed the concept of the song's music video, shot in one continuous take. On 15 November, Keung released his sixth single "Love Visa Application". The song and music video were recorded and produced during Keung's trip to Taiwan. Keung participated in writing the lyrics of the song and the story of the music video.

On 19 March 2021, Keung released "Master Class", a Reggaeton and Blues song, receiving widespread positive feedback. On 29 May 2021, "Master Class" became Keung's first single to top four Hong Kong mainstream music charts. His eighth single, "Dear My Friend," was released on 5 August 2021. The ballad details his grief for his late friend Kin Lam who died unexpectedly in March 2021. The single topped the weekly local streaming charts on KKBOX, Moov and Joox for four weeks. The song also won Most Popular Song at the 2021 Ultimate Song Chart Awards Presentation, making him the only winner to have won both Most Popular Song and Most Popular Male Singer in consecutive years. On 27 August, Error member Fatboy and Keung released the single "Agent Fat Keung 2.0", as a continuation from their first performance together (特務肥姜), in Good Night Show - King Maker. 

Keung, along with Mirror members Ian Chan, Anson Lo, Anson Kong, Jer Lau, and Edan Lui headlined concert "MOOV LIVE Music on the Road" on 7 and 8 December. He collaborated with singer-songwriter AGA on the single "I Know", released on December 16.

His ninth solo single "Spiegel im Spiegel" (German for "Mirror in Mirror") was released on 2 January 2022. He first performed the song live at MOOV Live Music on the Road on 7 December 2021. Keung's tenth single "What the Work Says" (作品的說話) was released on 30 April 2022. The song spreads a message on world peace.

Acting career 
Keung made his acting debut on the ViuTV television series Retire to Queen. Keung made a cameo appearance in the youth drama series We are the Littles, which aired in December 2020. He starred in the drama series Ink at Tai Ping, which aired in January 2021. In August 2020, Keung began filming for Taiwanese drama Sometimes When We Touch. Filming concluded on 15 November. The series began airing in August 2021. He made his film debut in the Kearen Pang film Mama's Affair, in which he co-stars with Teresa Mo and Jer Lau.

Discography

Singles

As lead artist

Collaborations

Soundtrack appearances

Filmography

Film

Television series

Variety show

Concerts

Awards and nominations

Film Award

Lists

Notes

References

External links 
 
 

1999 births
Living people
King Maker contestants
Mirror (group) members
Cantopop singers
Hong Kong male singers
21st-century Hong Kong male singers
Hong Kong male film actors
Hong Kong male television actors
Hong Kong idols